Bryce Seligman DeWitt (January 8, 1923 – September 23, 2004), was an American theoretical physicist noted for his work in gravitation and quantum field theory.

Personal life
He was born Carl Bryce Seligman, but he and his three brothers, including the noted ichthyologist Hugh Hamilton DeWitt, added "DeWitt" from their mother's side of the family, at the urging of their father, in 1950. In the early-1970s, this change of name so angered Felix Bloch that he blocked DeWitt's appointment to Stanford University and DeWitt and his wife Cecile DeWitt-Morette, a mathematical physicist, accepted faculty positions at the University of Texas at Austin. DeWitt served in World War II as a naval aviator.  He died September 23, 2004 from pancreatic cancer at the age of 81. He is buried in France, and was survived by his wife and four daughters.

Academic life 
He received his bachelor's (summa cum laude), master's and doctoral degrees from Harvard University. His Ph.D. (1950) supervisor was Julian S. Schwinger. Afterwards, he held a postdoctoral position at the Institute for Advanced Study in Princeton, New Jersey, worked at the Lawrence Livermore Lab, and then held faculty positions at the University of North Carolina at Chapel Hill and, later, the University of Texas at Austin. He was awarded the Dirac Prize in 1987, the Pomeranchuk Prize in 2002, and the American Physical Society's Einstein Prize posthumously in 2005, and was a member of the National Academy of Sciences.

Work 
He pioneered work in the quantization of general relativity and, in particular, developed canonical quantum gravity, manifestly covariant methods, and heat kernel algorithms.  DeWitt formulated the Wheeler–DeWitt equation for the wave function of the universe with John Archibald Wheeler and advanced the formulation of Hugh Everett's many-worlds interpretation of quantum mechanics. With his student Larry Smarr, he originated the field of numerical relativity.

Books
 Bryce DeWitt, Dynamical theory of groups and fields, Gordon and Breach, New York, 1965
 Bryce DeWitt, R. Neill Graham, eds., The Many-Worlds Interpretation of Quantum Mechanics, Princeton Series in Physics, Princeton University Press (1973), .
 S. M. Christensen, ed., Quantum theory of gravity. Essays in honor of the 60th birthday of Bryce S. DeWitt, Adam Hilger, Bristol, 1984.
 Bryce DeWitt, Supermanifolds, Cambridge University Press, Cambridge, 1985.
 Bryce DeWitt, The Global Approach to Quantum Field Theory, The International Series of Monographs on Physics, Oxford University Press, 2003, .
 Bryce DeWitt, Sopra un raggio di luce, Di Renzo Editore, Roma, 2005.
 Bryce DeWitt, Bryce DeWitt's Lectures on Gravitation, Steven M. Christensen, ed., Springer, 2011.

References

Further reading

External links 
 University of Texas obituary
 INSPIRE-HEP list of Dewitt's most famous papers
 Dirac Prize citation, International Centre for Theoretical Physics
 Einstein Prize citation, American Physical Society
 Oral history interview transcript with Bryce DeWitt and Cecile DeWitt-Morette on February 28 1995, American Institute of Physics, Niels Bohr Library & Archives
 Gaina Alex: The Quantum Gravity Simposim in Moscow, 1987 Gaina Alex: ГОСТИННАЯ:ФОРУМ: Александр Александров *Сборник рассказов*:РЕПРЕССИРОВАННАЯ НАУКА (PURGED SCIENCE)
 Steven Weinberg, "Bryce Seligman Dewitt", Biographical Memoirs of the National Academy of Sciences (2008)

1923 births
2004 deaths
Harvard University alumni
Deaths from pancreatic cancer
20th-century American physicists
American relativity theorists
Fellows of the American Physical Society
University of Texas at Austin faculty
Members of the United States National Academy of Sciences
Jewish physicists
Deaths from cancer in Texas